The Men's omnium was one of the 6 men's events at the 2010 European Track Championships, held in Pruszków, Poland.

21 cyclists participated in the contest. The race was held on November 6.

Flying Lap

Points race 30 km

Elimination race

Individual Pursuit 4 km

Scratch race 15 km

1km time trial

Final Classification

References

Flying Lap Results
Points Race Results
Elimination Race Results
Individual Pursuit Results
Scratch Race Results
Time Trial Results
Final Classification

Men's omnium
European Track Championships – Men's omnium